Gustav Friedrich (von) Hetsch (28 September 1788 – 7 September 1864)  was a Danish architect.

Biography
Hetsch was born in Stuttgart, he was the son of Philipp Friedrich von Hetsch (1758–1838).

He studied at the University of Tübingen and in Paris, where his teacher was Charles Percier.  After finishing his studies, he worked for Jean-Baptiste Rondelet on the Church of Sainte-Geneviève.  In 1812 he was recalled to Stuttgart, but soon left for Italy, where he continued his studies and met the Danish architect  (1781–1865).  It was Malling who in 1815 inspired Hetsch to come to Copenhagen, where he taught at the Royal Danish Academy of Fine Arts. In 1820 he became a member of the academy, 1822 professor of perspective, 1829 professor extraordinarily, 1835  professor of architecture.

One of Hetsch's first major projects was the interior decoration of the rebuilt Christiansborg Palace, where Christian Frederik Hansen was the principal architect.  Though most of his accomplishments were in the area of decorative art, Hetsch also designed the Great Synagogue (1833) and St. Ansgar's Church (1842) in Copenhagen. In parallel with his duties at the academy he held several other positions, including that of artistic director of the Royal Porcelain Factory (1828–1857).

Gallery

References

Other sources
 
 

Danish neoclassical architects
German emigrants to Denmark
Architects from Stuttgart
1788 births
1864 deaths
Academic staff of the Royal Danish Academy of Fine Arts
University of Tübingen alumni